The Diocese of Sulcis or Diocese of Sulci (Latin: Dioecesis Sulcitana) was a Roman Catholic diocese located in the Sulcis region in the Province of South Sardinia. Erected in 484, it was suppressed in 1514. In 1966, it was restored as a Titular Episcopal See.

Ordinaries

 Mariano da Sulci  ( 1215 Appointed - 27 Mar 1218 Appointed, Archbishop of Cagliari)
 Mordascius Sismondi  ( 1281 Appointed - )
 Comita  ( 1300 Appointed - 1324 Died)
 Angelo di Portasole (Portasola, Porta Sole, Porta Sola), O.P.  (24 Apr 1325 Appointed - 12 Feb 1330 Appointed, Bishop of Grosseto)
 Bartolomeo , O. Carm.  (12 Feb 1330 Appointed - 1332 Died)
 Guglielmo Jornet, O.F.M.  (24 Apr 1332 Appointed - 1334 Died)
 Guglielmo Jaffer  (8 Apr 1334 Appointed - )
 Mariano  ( 1342 Appointed - 1349 Died)
 Ramón Gilet  (18 May 1349 Appointed - 1359 Died)
 Francesco Alegre, O.P.  (8 Jun 1359 Appointed - 1364 Died)
 Leonardus , O.F.M.  (27 Nov 1364 Appointed - )
 Corrado de Cloaco  (24 Apr 1387 Appointed - 1389 Resigned)
 Filippo  (5 Apr 1389 Appointed - )
 Biagio di Prato  (4 Apr 1398 Confirmed - 1409 Died)
 Giovanni Cassani, O.E.S.A.  (4 May 1418 Appointed - 1441 Died)
 Sisinnio  (19 Nov 1442 Appointed - 5 Jul 1443 Appointed, Bishop of Ampurias)
 Antonio Presto, O.P.  (24 Jul 1443 Appointed - 1447 Died)
 Garsias , O.F.M.  (22 Sep 1447 Appointed - 1461 Died)
 Giuliano Matovi, O.P.  (6 Nov 1461 Appointed - 1487 Died)
 Simon Vargius, O.F.M.  (4 Apr 1487 Appointed - 1503 Died)
 Juan Pilars (1503–1514 Appointed, Archbishop of Cagliari)

References

Former Roman Catholic dioceses in Italy